Keith Allen Raniere (born August 26, 1960) is an American criminal convicted for a pattern of racketeering activity including human trafficking, sex offenses, and fraud. He co-founded NXIVM, a purported-self-help multi-level marketing company offering personal development seminars and headquartered in Albany, New York. Operating from 1998 to 2018, at its height, NXIVM had 700 members, including celebrities and the wealthy. In NXIVM, Raniere was referred to by members as "Vanguard".

Scholars in the fields of religious studies, law and sociology describe NXIVM as a cult. Journalists, mental health professionals and cult experts such as Rick Ross, Diane Benscoter, and Steve Hassan call Raniere a cult leader who manipulates and exerts coercive control over his followers. Multiple accusers identified Raniere as a prolific sexual abuser of women and girls since the 1980s.

In 2018, offenses related to a secret society within NXIVM, known as "DOS" or "the Vow", led to the arrests of Raniere and five other NXIVM associates. On June 19, 2019, a jury in an Eastern District of New York convicted Raniere of racketeering for a pattern of crimes including the sexual exploitation of a child, sex trafficking of women, and conspiracy to commit forced labor. More than 100 letters and statements from victims were sent to the court about the harm Raniere caused them. On October 27, 2020, judge Nicholas Garaufis sentenced Raniere to 120 years and a $1.75 million fine. The Federal Bureau of Prisons lists Raniere as an inmate of United States Penitentiary, Tucson.

Early life

Childhood and education
Keith Raniere was born on August 26, 1960 to James Raniere (1932–2020), a New York City advertising executive, and Vera Oschypko (1931–1978), a ballroom dancing instructor. When Raniere was five, his family relocated from Brooklyn to Suffern, New York. When he was around eight years old, his parents separated.

Raniere attended Suffern High School for ninth grade before transferring to Rockland Country Day School in Congers. He graduated in June 1978, two months prior to his eighteenth birthday. As an adult, Raniere reported that he read Isaac Asimov's mind control-themed work Second Foundation at age 12 and credited the novel with inspiring his work in NXIVM.

Raniere's former partner, Barbara Bouchey, has shared stories about his childhood which she claimed to have been told by his father, James: "What we did is we told Keith about how gifted and how intelligent he was. And he said it was almost like a switch went off. And suddenly overnight he turned into like Jesus Christ. And that he was superior and better than everybody, like he was a deity. He said it was that dramatic and that profound. He said it went right to his head."

Bouchey herself likewise recalled a story about a 13-year-old Raniere's relationships with girls: "[Dozens] of young girls were calling the house and [Raniere's mother] was overhearing his conversations with them where he was telling every single girl the same thing: 'I love you. You're the special one. You're important. You are the only one in my life and I love you.' And she says, he's saying this to all these girls. He's clearly lying 'cause all of them are not special! In 1982, Raniere graduated from Rensselaer Polytechnic Institute with a 2.26 GPA "having failed or barely passed many of the upper-level math and science classes he bragged about taking."

Early adulthood
In 1984, according to reporting by the Albany Times Union, the then 24-year-old Raniere allegedly seduced and sexually abused the 15-year-old Gina Melita after the two met in a theater group. After ending their relationship, Melita introduced him to her friend Gina Hutchinson, also 15, whom he also abused. After Gina's sister Heidi found Raniere climbing into her bedroom window and confronted the pair, Raniere told her that Gina was a "Buddhist goddess meant to be with him."

Gina dropped out of school and continued her relationship with Raniere, working at Consumers' Buyline, his multi-level marketing company (MLM), for a time. On October 11, 2002, she was found dead of a gunshot wound to her head on the grounds of the Karma Triyana Dharmachakra Buddhist monastery in Woodstock, an apparent suicide.

In June 1988, the Times Union profiled Raniere, reporting on his membership in the Mega Society after he achieved a high score on founder Ronald K. Hoeflin's MEGA test, an unsupervised, 48-question test published in the April 1985 issue of Omni magazine. Although the MEGA test has been widely criticized as not having been properly validated, the 1989 edition of the Guinness Book of World Records (the last edition to include a category for highest IQ) described the Hoeflin Research Group as "the most exclusive ultrahigh IQ society", and the 1989 Australian edition identified Raniere, Marilyn vos Savant, and Eric Hart as the highest-scoring members of the group.

Multi-level marketing career
Through the 1980s, Raniere was involved with the MLM company Amway. Heidi Hutchinson recalled that during the late 1980s, Raniere was fascinated by Amway, Scientology, and neuro-linguistic programming. He also worked as a computer programmer for New York State's Division of Parole.

Consumers' Buyline Inc. 
By 1990, Raniere founded his own multi-level marketing company, Consumers' Buyline Inc. (CBI). It was at a CBI pitch meeting that Raniere met Toni Natalie, who subsequently became a top seller for the organization along with her then-husband. Natalie and her son later moved to Clifton Park, New York, to be near Raniere; her marriage ended shortly thereafter. Natalie and Raniere dated for the next eight years.

CBI's operations were restricted in 1993 after the company was investigated by twenty states. That year, New York State filed a lawsuit alleging the organization was a pyramid scheme. CBI was permanently shut down in September 1996 by the Attorney General of New York after being investigated by 25 states. Raniere signed a consent order permanently barring him from "promoting, offering or granting participation in a chain distribution scheme" and ordering him to pay a $40,000 fine.

National Health Network 
In 1994, Raniere created National Health Network, a multi-level seller of vitamins. That business failed in 1999. In the mid-1990s, Raniere and Natalie operated a health-products store.

NXIVM: Executive Success Programs
In 1998, Toni Natalie met Nancy Salzman, a nurse and a practitioner of hypnotism and neuro-linguistic programming. Natalie recalled:
Nancy said, "You're so wonderful, how can I help you?" So I said, "Well, you can help me with my boyfriend." He had grandiose ideas and his hours were becoming erratic again ... She listened and she said "Oh that's easy, I can help you. He's a sociopath ..." They met and four days later she came out with the glazed eyes and gave me the, "You don't know who he is," and I was like, "Wow, there goes another one."

Also in 1998, Raniere met Christine Marie Melanakos, a recently divorced mother who had won the title of Mrs. Michigan 1995. She recalled that Raniere "explained how there was a profound event that would often happen to the women who became intimate with him, sometimes they would even see a blue light ... Ultimately I agreed to be intimate with Keith, and it was just as he said. I even saw a blue light, but I don't think I told him so. I remember thinking, 'Wow, my brain is really susceptible to the power of suggestion.

Raniere and Salzman founded Executive Success Programs, a personal development company offering a range of techniques aimed at self-improvement. A few years later, the program was rebranded under the name NXIVM. Raniere "adopted the title 'Vanguard' from a favorite arcade game in which the destruction of one's enemies increased one's own power." Much of NXIVM was influenced by the teachings of Ayn Rand, one of Raniere's favorite authors.

Raniere's eight-year relationship with Natalie ended in 1999. She later claimed to have been the victim of harassment. In a January 2003 ruling, federal judge Robert Littlefield implied Raniere was using a legal suit to harass his former partner. Wrote Littlefield: "This matter smacks of a jilted fellow's attempt at revenge or retaliation against his former girlfriend, with many attempts at tripping her up along the way."

In 2002, Raniere and Salzman succeeded in recruiting members of the influential Bronfman family, heirs to the multibillion-dollar Seagram's fortune. Sara Bronfman initially became involved, followed by sister Clare Bronfman. Their father, Edgar Bronfman Sr., took a NXIVM course the following year.

Disappearance of Kristin Snyder
Kristin Marie Snyder was a 35-year-old environmental consultant who, in November 2002, paid $7,000 to enroll in a sixteen-day personal development course conducted in Anchorage, Alaska, hosted by Salzman. The following January, Snyder traveled to New York State to visit Raniere and other NXIVM leaders. Snyder's mother recalled that her daughter "had come to believe she was responsible for the Columbia shuttle disaster" and "thought Keith was incredible". Snyder signed up for a second sixteen-day course in Anchorage.

On February 6, 2003, the tenth day of the second seminar, Snyder reportedly began claiming to be pregnant with Raniere's child, a claim allegedly corroborated by Clare Bronfman. Clifford recalled: "I was told [by a NXIVM instructor] not to bring her to the hospital. That's what makes me feel really bad." Snyder was last seen leaving this session of the course. Her vehicle was discovered two days later in Seward, Alaska, 120 miles from Anchorage. Police recovered a note that read: "I attended a course called Executive Success Programs ... based out of Anchorage, AK, and Albany, NY. I was brainwashed and my emotional center of the brain was killed/turned off. I still have feeling in my external skin, but my internal organs are rotting ... I am sorry life, I didn't know I was already dead. May we persist into the future." A separate page added: "No need to search for my body."

A witness at Raniere's 2019 trial testified that after Snyder disappeared, Raniere paid $24,000 to obtain the password to her email account.

2003 Forbes exposé

In October 2003, Raniere was featured, cloaked in shadows, on the cover of Forbes magazine, accompanied by the appellation "The World's Strangest Executive Coach". The "devastating" cover story, penned by Michael Freedman and entitled "Cult of Personality", has been described as "a gold mine of previously unpublished information". The story discussed Raniere's title "Vanguard" and detailed his previous shuttered business, Consumers' Buyline, and included a quote from Edgar Bronfman accusing the organization of being a cult.

Vanity Fair subsequently reported on the Forbes article's impact within the group: "People at NXIVM were stunned. Expecting a positive story, the top ranks had spoken to Forbes, including Raniere, Salzman, and Sara Bronfman. What upset them above all were Edgar Bronfman's remarks." According to Vanity Fair, the article was a turning point in Raniere's relationship with Edgar Bronfman: That,' says one woman, 'was when Edgar Bronfman became NXIVM's enemy. A witness at Raniere's trial later testified that Bronfman's computer was compromised and his emails monitored by group members for a period of years.

Commodities trades
Barbara Bouchey spent $1.6 million covering losses of commodities trades which Raniere made in her name. From January 2005 until late 2007, Raniere lost nearly $70 million in commodities trading. Raniere suggested to Clare Bronfman that the losses were due to market manipulation by her father. Beginning in August 2005, the Bronfman sisters covered the losses, ultimately using $150 million of their funds in support of Raniere and his organization.

Collaborations with the Dalai Lama
 Eager to distance themselves from "cult" allegations in the press, NXIVM members sought the endorsement of the Dalai Lama, spending $2 million on the project.

Eight years later, it was revealed that, in 2009, Sara Bronfman had a sexual relationship with Lama Tenzin Dhonden, the Dalai Lama's gatekeeper who arranged the appearance; and who, as a monk, had taken a vow of celibacy. Amid accusations of corruption, Dhonden was replaced.

On May 6, 2009, the Dalai Lama traveled to Albany to give a talk; during the event, he presented Raniere with a white scarf onstage. The Dalai Lama additionally wrote the foreword to the book The Sphinx and Thelxiepeia, which Raniere co-authored in 2009. The prior year, Raniere had co-authored his first book, Odin and The Sphinx.

Mass resignations and public allegations
In 2009, a group of Raniere's associates (called the "NXIVM Nine") broke with Raniere and his organization, citing "concerns about unethical practices and the alleged abuse of his leadership status to sexually manipulate women in the organization." One of the dissenters, Barbara Bouchey, had been Raniere's partner for nine years.

In November 2010, Vanity Fair published an article titled "The Heiresses and the Cult" in which Raniere's former partner Toni Natalie recalled that Raniere "had insisted she keep the body of her dead puppy in her garage freezer and look at it daily." That same month, The New York Post reported on the existence of a video in which Raniere is heard telling two followers: "I've had people killed because of my beliefsor because of their beliefs." In a 2010 Albany Times Union article, NXIVM former coaches characterized students as "prey" for Raniere to satisfy either his gambling or sexual proclivities.

In 2011, Toni Natalie filed documents in federal court alleging that she had been repeatedly raped by Raniere.

Departure of Kristin Keeffe
Kristin Keeffe was a longtime partner of Raniere and the mother of his first child. Keeffe stated at Raniere's sentencing that Raniere had never paid child support for their teenage son.
In 2010, the tabloid New York Post reported "Albany cult takes orphan";   It was later revealed the child 'adopted' by Raniere and Keeffe was their biological child. In 2010, it was reported that Raniere had ordered that the child be kept away from peers and that he was being cared for by nannies speaking five different languages.

In February 2014, Keeffe broke with Raniere and his group. After she fled the region with her son, an email bearing her name explained: "I have full sole legal custody of Gaelyn. Keith was experimenting on him. I had to get Gaelyn away." Keeffe publicly described Raniere as "dangerous".

In 2015, it was reported that Keeffe had alleged that Raniere directed Canadian investigative firm Canaprobe to obtain financial information on six federal judges and a US senator from the State of New York as well as a reporter, an editor, and the publisher of the Times Union. That same year, Keeffe further alleged that Raniere had planned to lure his critics to Mexico with an invitation to an anti-cult conference; once in Mexico, the critics were to be arrested on false charges by order of a judge who had been bribed.

Patent infringement litigation
In 2015, Raniere personally sued AT&T and Microsoft, alleging they had infringed on his patents. The following year, the case was dismissed with prejudice. The trial court ruled that Raniere's "conduct throughout this litigation, culminating in his untruthful testimony at the hearing on the motion to dismiss, demonstrates a pattern of obfuscation and bad faith." Raniere was sanctioned and ordered to pay $450,000 in attorneys fees.

Sexual abuse of girls and young women
At his trial, prosecutors introduced evidence that Raniere held views approving sexual assault, child sexual abuse, and incest. Public accusations of sexually predatory behavior and inappropriate relationships with minors have trailed Raniere since the early 2010s. Soon after his arrest in 2018, prosecutors opposed bail, writing that Raniere had "a decades’ long history of abusing women and girls. According to confidential sources, the defendant [Raniere] had repeated sexual encounters with multiple teenage girls in the mid-to-late 1980s and early 1990s."

2012 Times Union exposé 
In 2012, the Times Union published an exposé that included three accounts of Raniere seducing and abusing girls under the age of consent. One woman spoke to the Times Union on condition of anonymity. In 1990, her mother worked for Raniere's multi-level marketing company, Consumers' Buyline Inc. In her account, she was befriended by Raniere and his live-in partners Kristin Keeffe, Karen Unterreiner and Pamela Cafritz. Raniere offered to tutor her in Latin and Algebra as a pretext to seduce and sexually abuse her when she was 12 years old. After showing adverse childhood experiences, she received counseling for victims of sex abuse and filed a State Police report against Raniere in 1993. The complaint was not forwarded to prosecutors because she had declined to wear a wire to obtain a confession from Raniere. The woman told the Times Union, "[Raniere] took my innocence. I can never get that back."

Abuse of sisters from Monterrey 
In the criminal case against Raniere, prosecutors established that starting in 2002, Raniere gained a Svengali-like control over an NXIVM family from Monterrey, Mexico. All the family members moved to Albany, New York. The family's three daughters were sexually groomed by Raniere as teenagers, with the sisters eventually becoming sexual partners of Raniere.

 The eldest ("Marianna") is the mother of Raniere's second biological child. Clare Bronfman is known to support this child through a trust fund.
 The middle child ("Daniela") was groomed as a minor and began a sexual relationship with Raniere days after her 18th birthday.
 Raniere began sexually abusing the youngest ("Camila") in 2005 when she was 15 years old.

The prosecution established that Raniere impregnated each sister at various times and compelled them to obtain abortions. In addition, Daniela testified that Raniere's partner Pamela Cafritz coached each sister to refuse to answer questions about paternity to prevent Raniere's abuse from becoming known to any nurse who might be a mandated reporter.

Daniela
According to Daniela's testimony as a prosecution witness at the 2019 trial, Raniere claimed to all three sisters that he had "mystical" powers, including the ability to heal through sex. He also claimed that he required each sister make him their exclusive romantic partner, as their infidelity toward him could physically "hurt" him. Daniela said Raniere also attempted to coax her into a sex act with her sister Marianna.

Beginning in 2010, Daniela was kept under an extralegal house arrest verging on solitary confinement for two years in her family home. The pretext to her family was that she had stolen money. Daniela maintained her captivity began when she told Raniere she had romantic feelings for another man. Raniere accused her of an "ethical breach" and assigned Lauren Salzman to help her "learn from her mistakes". Daniela described her spartan conditions as a room with blacked-out windows with only a mattress on the floor, a pen, and paper. Daniela was only allowed to speak to Salzman; other family members were instructed to shun her. Daniela said her confinement ended in 2012 after she almost attempted suicide but instead decided to leave her family home. After escaping her captivity, Daniela went to a volleyball game to confront Raniere. Raniere tried to run and hide from her. She was later escorted out of the NXIVM community and was left at the Mexico border with less than $80 and no personal documents.

Salzman corroborated Daniela's account at the trial. Salzman testified that Daniela's efforts to leave the room (including cleaning her room, exercising, and writing letters to Raniere every day) were all rejected. Raniere told Salzman to ignore a letter sent by Daniela pleading to be let out and brushed it off as "a tantrum". Salzman admitted that she and others were incredibly abusive to Daniela, and nothing Daniela did was the right thing.

Camila
At Raniere's trial, prosecutors accused Raniere of the sexual exploitation of Daniela's underage sister Camila, narrating it through Daniela's testimony, hospital records and transcripts of Raniere's communication with Camila, as well as sexually explicit photos of Camila found in Raniere's home. Prosecutors also introduced WhatsApp messages between Raniere and Camila, which showed that Raniere considered her as his "slave" and tasked her with finding more sex slaves, which Raniere calls "successors" and expresses a preference for women shorter than him, younger and virgins.

While Camila did not testify during the trial, she confirmed the sexual abuse at Raniere's sentencing in her victim impact statement. Camila said she met Raniere at age 13 and began a sexual relationship with Raniere when she was 15 years old, which lasted for twelve years. The abusive relationship with Raniere continued into her adulthood, where Raniere's control and demands on her led to her developing an eating disorder, self-harming and attempting suicide.

DOS: Dominus Obsequious Sororium

Creation, membership and collateral
In 2015, Raniere created a secret subgroup within NXIVM called "DOS", an acronym for "Dominus Obsequious Sororium", a quasi-Latin phrase that loosely translates to "Master Over the Slave Women" or "Lord/Master of the Obedient Female Companions". DOS operated with levels of women "slaves" headed by "masters". Slaves were expected to recruit slaves of their own, becoming masters themselves. Slaves owed service not only to their own masters but also to masters above them in the DOS pyramid. An estimated 150 women joined DOS. Raniere was the only male in DOS and sat at the top of the pyramid as the "grandmaster".

Raniere initially recruited eight women to join DOS, including Allison Mack, Nicki Clyne, and Lauren Salzman. These women became Raniere's inner circle members and his "first-line masters" in DOS. When new DOS slaves were recruited, they were explicitly told that the organization was women-only, and that the organization would empower them and eradicate weaknesses that the NXIVM curriculum taught were common in women. Except for Raniere's inner circle members, none of the slaves knew that Raniere was involved with DOS when they were recruited.

Raniere maintained command and control over DOS members by collecting "collateral" — which included highly damaging personal information, sexually explicit photos or videos, and rights to personal assets — and relied on his inner circle members to carry out his orders and build the DOS pyramid group. Women were required to provide collateral before joining DOS and continue to give new collateral every month after joining it. Slaves were told that their collateral could be released for any number of reasons, including if they left DOS, spoke publicly about DOS, or repeatedly failed DOS obligations or assignments.

Mental, physical and sexual abuse of members
Raniere tasked his inner circle members with various DOS projects and devised assignments for DOS slaves, including instructions for seduction assignments in which DOS masters implicitly or expressly directed their slaves to engage in sexual activity with Raniere. The assignments (and the insistence that collateral could be released for disobedience) was the basis for Raniere's indictment and convictions for sex trafficking and attempted sex trafficking.

Raniere employed a variety of methods of exercising power and control over DOS members: 
Raniere encouraged DOS masters to use demeaning and derogatory language and racial slurs to humiliate DOS slaves.
DOS slaves were seriously sleep-deprived from forced participation in "readiness drills", which required them to respond to their masters any time, day or night.
DOS members were subject to corporal punishment, which included being forced to hold painful poses, stand barefoot in the snow, take cold showers and whip each other with the strap. At trial, evidence and testimony suggested that Raniere ordered the abuse to escalate into extralegal imprisonment using a cage. The plan was abandoned after the exposure of DOS in 2017.
Required slaves to perform menial tasks for their masters, from running errands to cleaning their homes and other free labour.
Many DOS slaves were also groomed for sex with Raniere. This preparation included extreme dieting to satisfy Raniere's preference for "exceptionally thin" women. These slaves were forced to adhere to extremely restrictive diets and document every food they ate. The extreme diet caused women to stop menstruating and their hair to fall out. Slaves were also ordered to remain celibate and stop removing their pubic hair. Slaves were told that they were being given these orders to benefit themselves. While Raniere demanded women around him remain excruciatingly thin and claiming any extra weight on a woman disrupted his sexual energy, Raniere himself binged on junk food.

Branding of DOS members

DOS members were branded in their pelvic regions with a symbol that, unbeknownst to them, incorporated Raniere's initials. Some slaves were told the brand stood for the elements. Only Raniere's inner circle members knew the brand was his initials. At Raniere's trial, prosecutors introduced a recording of a private meeting with DOS inner circle members in which Raniere stated: "The monogram as it is right now is very directly related to my initials." The group discussed how to obscure the connection to Raniere's initials from DOS members.

The DOS branding ritual followed a script created by Raniere: slaves were required to be fully naked, with the ceremonies filmed and used as more collateral on the DOS slaves. In a recorded conversation between Mack and Raniere discussing the branding, Raniere told Mack, "The person should probably ask to be branded. They should probably say that before they're held down, so it doesn't seem like they're being coerced." NXIVM member Dr. Danielle Roberts performed the branding of DOS members using a cauterizing pen. The New York State Department of Health later revoked Roberts's medical license following an investigation into the branding of members.

The purpose and aim of DOS
Lauren Salzman stated at the trial that the DOS pyramid had four levels of slaves, each reporting to their master on the level above them, and all of them ultimately accountable to Raniere, the grandmaster. Salzman testified that the overriding emphasis of DOS was to venerate Raniere and foster an atmosphere of "total obedience and secrecy". DOS members communicated using encrypted phone applications like Telegram and Signal, and members' identities were not always known to each another. The aim of the "readiness drills" was to reinforce the idea that responding to a master was the most important part of any slave's life. Salzman said the DOS brand was designed to be permanent, and "the idea of the brand was to memorialize on [their] body the promise [they] made." Salzman also testified that she was helping Raniere edit his DOS manifesto that enforced the master-slave relationships.

Excerpts from the book included:
 The best slave derives the highest pleasure from being her Master's ultimate tool.
 Your sole highest desire must be to further your Master from whom all good things come and are related.
 A good slave actively seeks to give her Master a competitive advantage over all other people.
 It doesn't matter what the command is, it matters that you obey. It doesn't matter that you understand the command, it matters that you obey.

According to DOS members, Raniere had envisioned DOS to grow into thousands of members, with DOS sororities across the country. DOS members were encouraged to recruit "people of power and influence" to the group. Raniere wanted to get members involved in government so they could spread the ideas he taught and followed throughout society. Salzman testified that Raniere hoped to have a DOS candidate in a high-level political office and that the individual would be "highly collateralized".

Exposure of DOS 
On June 5, 2017, Frank Parlato was the first to report that there was a secret sorority called DOS and the women known as "slaves" were branded with Raniere's initials. On October 17, 2017, The New York Times published a story about the slaves and branding and reported that the slaves were required to provide nude photos or other potentially damaging information about themselves if they wished to join.

At Raniere's trial, a DOS slave testified that when she finally confronted Raniere, he told her that DOS was "a walk in the park", saying, "You guys think you have it so bad. But this is nothing compared to other alternative subculture groups."

Following his conviction, in an email to Nicki Clyne, Raniere defended his formation of DOS, stating: "I believe the sorority is good – not just good and even noble, but great – and vitally important for women and humanity. The missing part of our society, found in a secret group of women like this, aches to be embraced; we should deeply mourn its possible loss."

Arrest, trial and conviction

In the wake of The New York Times article, Raniere fled to Mexico, accompanied by a few members of his inner circle. A search warrant was issued for Raniere's email account on January 18, 2018. An FBI Special Agent filed a sealed criminal complaint and obtained a warrant for Raniere's arrest from the US District Court for the Eastern District of New York on February 14, 2018.

Mexican Federal Police located Raniere in a luxury villa outside Puerto Vallarta, Mexico. Mexican Federal Police authorities raided the villa, arresting Raniere and deporting him as persona non grata. Lauren Salzman later testified at the trial that Raniere and his inner circle members were preparing for a "recommitment ceremony" when the authorities arrived to arrest him. The ceremony was to include group oral sex as a way to do "something special" for Raniere and to pledge their continued dedication to Raniere and NXIVM. When the police arrived, Salzman and Raniere barricaded themselves in the master suite, with Raniere attempting to hide in a walk-in closet.

Pre-trial proceedings 
American authorities took custody of Raniere and presented him in federal court in Fort Worth, Texas and later transferred him to custody in New York at Metropolitan Detention Center, Brooklyn. The unsealed complaint accused Raniere of a variety of crimes related to DOS, including sex trafficking, conspiracy for sex trafficking, and conspiracy to commit forced labor. The complaint alleged that at least one woman was coerced into sex with Raniere, who forced DOS members to undergo the branding ritual alleged by former DOS member Sarah Edmondson and others. United States Attorney Richard Donoghue stated that Raniere "created a secret society of women with whom he had sex and had branded with his initials, coercing them with the threat of releasing their highly personal information and taking their assets."

From his 2018 arraignment in the United States District Court for the Eastern District of New York through his sentencing in 2021, prosecutors sought to keep Raniere remanded to the Metropolitan Detention Center, Brooklyn (MDC). Raniere's attorneys petitioned for his release on bail, including unsupported claims that Raniere could cure Tourette syndrome. Prosecutors argued against, citing the dangerousness of Raniere, his inconsistent answers about his income, and his previous flight to Mexico.

United States v. Keith Raniere trial 

Raniere's federal racketeering trial began on May 7, 2019. Prosecution witnesses included NXIVM member Lauren Salzman; filmmaker Mark Vicente; victims "Sylvie", "Daniela", "Jay", and "Nicole"; and cult educator Rick Alan Ross. The defense rested without calling any witnesses. On June 19, 2019, the jury found Raniere guilty on all charges after five hours of deliberation. The charged acts included:
 Sexual exploitation of Camila as a minor and possession of child sexual abuse material depicting her;
Sex trafficking and forced labor of "Nicole";
 Attempted sex trafficking of "Jay";
 Identity theft against Edgar Bronfman, James Loperfido, Ashana Chenoa, "Marianna", and Pam Cafritz;
 Subjecting Daniela to "document servitude" for labor and services;
 Conspiracy to alter records for use in an official proceeding; 
 Sex trafficking conspiracy, forced labor conspiracy, racketeering conspiracy, and wire fraud conspiracy.

Post-conviction 
While awaiting sentencing, Raniere's attorney Marc Agnifilo filed two motions for a new trial: in a March 2020 motion claiming witnesses perjured themselves; then, in an October 2020 motion, claiming that prosecutors had intimidated witnesses. Judge Garaufis denied both motions.

Loyalists' activities at Metropolitan Detention Complex 

Convicted in June 2019, the 2020 outbreak of the COVID-19 pandemic and its impact on prisons delayed Keith Raniere's sentencing until over a year later. Raniere remained in the Metropolitan Detention Complex (MDC) awaiting sentencing. While there he began communicating with a supporter, Suneel Chakravorty, who began recording their conversations. These recordings were released through a website as a podcast called Raniere Speaks with copyright held by Dialogue Productions, LLC. Raniere was thereafter forbidden by MDC officials from contacting Chakravorty.

In summer 2020, with the COVID-19 pandemic preventing in-person visitation to the MDC, Raniere's remaining followers including actress Nicki Clyne began assembling to dance near the jail. Though they initially claimed to be entertaining all of the detainees, they were seen with a sign addressed to "Kay Rose," a name sharing Raniere's initials. The group began calling itself "The Forgotten Ones" and "We Are As You." Former NXIVM member turned prosecution witness Mark Vicente dismissed the group as a "cover movement" for support of Raniere.

A July 16, 2020 intelligence analysis memorandum from the Bureau of Prisons Counter Terrorism Unit states that Raniere instructed Chakravorty to get more women to dance "erotically" outside of the MDC. In response, authorities at the MDC moved Raniere to another unit to keep the dancers out of his line of sight. A frustrated Raniere instructed his followers to help get him moved back by ingratiating themselves to prison staff, including offering coffee and donuts as they left their shifts.

Sentencing, restitution and appeal
Ahead of his sentencing, prosecutors submitted a number of Raniere's communications and disciplinary issues in prison as evidence of remorselessness and that he continues to control his followers. The communications included Raniere instructing his followers to have Alan Dershowitz, the attorney who successfully negotiated a non-prosecution agreement of the late Jeffrey Epstein, speak on his behalf; Dershowitz did not comment on the matter. Prosecutors also submitted documentation that Raniere and his follower Chakravorty used a false name and "burner phone" to evade detection, with Raniere instructing Chakravorty to "get scrutiny" on Judge Nicholas Garaufis, explaining that "the judge needs to know he's being watched".

As sentencing proceeded, federal prosecutors asked for life imprisonment for the severity of Raniere's crimes and his lack of remorse, arguing that he would continue to commit crimes if released. Prosecutors argued in their sentencing memorandum that Raniere "concealed his abuse behind the smoke screen of his supposed 'personal growth' programs — a charade he continues to this day."

On October 27, 2020, federal judge Nicholas Garaufis sentenced Raniere to 120 years in prison and fined him $1.75 million.  In January 2021, Raniere was transferred from Metropolitan Detention Center, Brooklyn to begin serving his 120-year sentence. The Federal Bureau of Prisons first transferred him temporarily to United States Penitentiary, Lewisburg, a medium-security penitentiary, followed by a transfer to his permanent prison at United States Penitentiary, Tucson. The facility in Tucson, Arizona is noted as the sole facility in the federal prison system that is both specially-designated for sex offenders and also at maximum-security level.

On July 20, 2021, Raniere made a virtual appearance from his Tucson, Arizona prison cell for a hearing on restitution, the last remaining material from the trial. Imprisoned co-defendant Clare Bronfman paid attorneys Marc Fernich and Jeffrey Lichtman to represent him. Judge Garaufis ruled that 21 victims of Raniere should receive a total of $3.46 million in restitution. This included payments to cover the cost removing the DOS-related scarification, ongoing mental health care, and making labor trafficking victims whole.

Judge Garaufis's order also states that "all lower-ranking DOS members are statutorily entitled to the return of their collateral, and it orders Mr. Raniere to effectuate that return to the fullest extent practicable." Due to Fifth Amendment concerns, this order is stayed until 60 days after the ruling on Raniere's appeal to the United States Court of Appeals for the Second Circuit.

Raniere gave notice of appeal of both his conviction and sentence to the Court of Appeals for the Second Circuit in November 2020. Oral arguments were heard on May 3, 2022. The Circuit upheld the decision and rejected the appeal on December 9, 2022. Judge José A. Cabranes wrote, "Raniere has failed to persuade us that there is insufficient evidence to sustain his convictions."

Edmondson v. Raniere lawsuit
In January 2020, Raniere and several other NXIVM leaders were named as defendants in a civil lawsuit filed in federal court by 80 former NXIVM members. The lawsuit details allegations of fraud and abuse and charges the NXIVM organisation with being a pyramid scheme, exploitation of its recruits, conducting illegal human experiments, and making it "physically and psychologically difficult, and in some cases impossible, to leave the coercive community." This case is ongoing .

Prison lawsuits 
In May 2022, Keith Raniere filed suit against the U.S. Department of Justice and Bureau of Prisons, alleging that his civil rights are violated as a prisoner in United States Penitentiary, Tucson. Raniere sought an injunction allowing visitation and phone calls from follower Suneel Chakravorty, who he claims is a paralegal working on his appeals. The Department of Justice, Bureau of Prisons and authorities at USP Tucson moved to deny the injunction, on grounds that Chakravorty is not a paralegal but merely "an ardent former ESP and NXIVM coach with whom [Raniere] is banned from associating."

Judge Raner Collins granted the Department of Justice's motion to dismiss the suit on grounds that Raniere failed to exhaust administrative remedies (in line with the Prison Litigation Reform Act), and his lawyer's insufficient service of process.

Homicide speculation
A number of Raniere's alleged lovers suffered untimely deaths. Gina Hutchinson was found dead of a gunshot wound to the head. Kristin Snyder disappeared and was last seen at a NXIVM event. Live-in girlfriends Barbara Jeske and Pam Cafritz both died from what was diagnosed as cancer at the time but is alleged to have actually been subtle poisoning. Raniere's partner Kristin Keeffe survived cervical cancer. In 2009, Raniere was filmed claiming, "I've had people killed because of my beliefs."

In 2019, Investigation Discovery aired a documentary titled "The Lost Women of NXIVM", speculating that Raniere committed homicide. According to that program, a woman who lived with Raniere and developed bladder cancer submitted a hair sample that reportedly revealed the evidence of dangerous levels of bismuth and barium.

In the media
In 2018, Josh Bloch compiled an investigative podcast series about NXIVM on CBC Radio titled Uncover: Escaping NXIVM.
 Investigation Discovery released a documentary titled The Lost Women of NXIVM. The two-hour special premiered on December 8, 2019. In it, Frank Parlato examines the deaths of four women who had connections to NXIVM and Keith Raniere.
 HBO released a docuseries about NXIVM titled The Vow. The documentary series premiered on August 23, 2020. Season 2 was released on October 17, 2022, and details Raniere's court trial.
Seduced: Inside the NXIVM Cult is a four-part documentary series that follows the story of India Oxenberg, her time at the NXIVM cult, its leader Keith Raniere and Allison Mack. The series premiered on Starz on October 18, 2020.

References

1960 births
20th-century American criminals
21st-century American criminals
American businesspeople convicted of crimes
American male criminals
American motivational speakers
American people convicted of child pornography offenses
American people convicted of child sexual abuse
American people convicted of mail and wire fraud
Businesspeople from New York City
Criminals from New York (state)
Cult leaders
Living people
NXIVM people
People convicted of forgery
People convicted of racketeering
People convicted of sex trafficking
People from Brooklyn
Prisoners sentenced to life imprisonment by the United States federal government
Rensselaer Polytechnic Institute alumni
Suspected serial killers
Waldorf school alumni